Herrison Hospital was a mental health facility in Charminster, Dorset.

History
The hospital, which was designed by Henry Edward Kendall Jr. using a Corridor Plan layout, opened as the Dorset County Asylum in 1863. A female annex, designed by George Thomas Hine, was added in 1896 and a private asylum for fee paying patients, known as Herrison House and also designed by Hine, was added in 1904. The facility became the Dorset County Mental Hospital in 1920 and Herrison Hospital in 1940 before joining the National Health Service in 1948.

After the introduction of Care in the Community in the early 1980s, the hospital went into a period of decline and closed in January 1992. The site was subsequently developed for residential use as Charlton Down. Three of the larger buildings — Redwood (the main structure built in 1863), Greenwood (the female annex built in 1896) and Herrison House (the private asylum built in 1904) — have been converted into apartments.

References

Defunct hospitals in England
Hospitals in Dorset
Hospital buildings completed in 1863
Hospitals established in 1863
1863 establishments in England
Former psychiatric hospitals in England
Hospitals disestablished in 1992
1992 disestablishments in England